The Schlegelmilch-McDaniel House is a house-turned-museum in Eau Claire, Wisconsin.  The house was built in 1871, one year before Eau Claire became a city.  Today, the house, located at 517 S. Farwell St., directly across Farwell St. from the Christ Church Cathedral, is an exhibit of the Chippewa Valley Museum.

External links
 Schlegelmilch House from the Chippewa Valley Museum
  Schlegelmilch House from the Eau Claire Historic Preservation Foundation

Houses in Eau Claire, Wisconsin
Museums in Eau Claire County, Wisconsin
Historic house museums in Wisconsin